Synanthedon spuleri is a moth of the family Sesiidae. It is found from  France to Turkey and Georgia. In the south, it is found in southern and eastern Europe. In the north, the range extends to the line Paris-southern Germany.

The wingspan is 13–24 mm. Adults are on wing from mid May to the end of July. Adults feed on the nectar of various flowers, including Sambuccus nigra, Frangula alnus, Sambuccus ebulus, Rubus and Ligustrum species.

The larvae feed within galls on Juniperus communis, Juniperus chinensis, Juniperus phoenicea, Abies alba, Populus, Salix, Betula, Carpinus, Fagus, Corylus, Quercus, Acer and Ulmus. The species overwinters in the larval stage. Completing the life cycle takes two years.

References

Moths described in 1908
Sesiidae
Moths of Europe